Andrés González (born 4 December 1945) is a Cuban gymnast. He competed in eight events at the 1964 Summer Olympics.

References

1945 births
Living people
Cuban male artistic gymnasts
Olympic gymnasts of Cuba
Gymnasts at the 1964 Summer Olympics
Place of birth missing (living people)
Pan American Games medalists in gymnastics
Pan American Games silver medalists for Cuba
Pan American Games bronze medalists for Cuba
Gymnasts at the 1963 Pan American Games
Gymnasts at the 1967 Pan American Games
20th-century Cuban people
21st-century Cuban people